John Noble (2 January 1931 – 21 March 2008) was an English baritone. He was Ralph Vaughan Williams's favourite in the title role of the composer's opera The Pilgrim's Progress.

Early life
Born in Southampton, the son of a gardener, Noble's love of music and performance began at Godalming Grammar School, Surrey. He gained a scholarship to Fitzwilliam College, Cambridge, where he graduated in geography. While there, he studied singing with the baritone Clive Carey, and George Guest arranged for him to join the choir of St. John's College for a postgraduate year.

Career
In 1954, Noble took the title role in Dennis Arundell's production of Ralph Vaughan Williams's The Pilgrim's Progress at the Cambridge Guildhall. The composer's wife, Ursula Vaughan Williams, recalled that Noble brought "a touching and dedicated dignity as the Pilgrim", and after the production's opening Vaughan Williams said, "This is what I meant." In 1970, Noble was asked to sing the role in the EMI recording conducted by Sir Adrian Boult.

A year of teaching geography followed university, but then he joined the BBC Singers and went on to make a living from solo engagements, supplemented by recordings with the Ambrosian Singers. As a concert singer his repertoire included Bach (singing the voice of Jesus in the Passions), Handel, Elgar, Britten, Delius, Tippett and Vaughan Williams. His operatic work included the vicar in Britten's Albert Herring for the English Opera Group, conducted by the composer and subsequently recorded by Decca (1964).

The conductor Meredith Davies invited him to join the staff of Trinity College of Music, London. He later taught at the Royal Northern College of Music, Manchester, and had a thriving teaching practice for the rest of his life.

He died aged 77 of pancreatic cancer.

Discography
 Britten – Albert Herring; with English Opera Group/Benjamin Britten (1964, Decca)
 Delius – Sea Drift; with Liverpool Philharmonic Chorus; Royal Liverpool Philharmonic Orchestra/Charles Groves (1973, EMI)
 Carl Orff – Carmina Burana; with Raymond Wolansky (tenor), Lucia Popp (soprano);  New Philharmonia Chorus (chorus master: Wilhelm Pitz), Wandsworth School Boys' Choir, New Philharmonia Orchestra, Rafael Frühbeck de Burgos (1966, EMI).
 Vaughan Williams – The Pilgrim's Progress; with London Philharmonic Choir; London Philharmonic Orchestra/Adrian Boult (1970–71, EMI)

References

1931 births
2008 deaths
Alumni of Fitzwilliam College, Cambridge
English operatic baritones
People educated at Godalming Grammar School
Musicians from Southampton
Academics of the Royal Northern College of Music
Deaths from pancreatic cancer
Deaths from cancer in England
20th-century British male  opera singers